Kati Whitaker is a British BBC and independent radio and television journalist. She has taken on the various roles of producer, reporter and presenter working in the field of current affairs and documentary.

Radio career 
Whitaker studied Philosophy, Politics and Economics (PPE) at Somerville College, Oxford. She was awarded a master's degree in 1977. She then trained in law. 

Whitaker began her career working as a current affairs producer at BBC World Service before rapidly moving on to be the weekly presenter of the live Radio 4 disabilities programme Does He take Sugar for nearly ten years; one of the regular presenters of the Sunday programme (religious news and current affairs) on Radio 4; reporter for BBC Breakfast; an attachment as bi-media health correspondent to BBC South; and news reporter and presenter for digital TV company The Medical Channel for whom she also took entire responsibility for their documentary output. Whitaker has also made over a hundred radio documentaries including Crossing Continents, File on 4 and The World Tonight. 

She now has a production company which makes documentaries for BBC Radio. She also makes videos and works as a media trainer and presentational coach.

Recent work
Executive producer/producer: Cuban Voices for BBC World Service (2019)
Producer/presenter: The pity of War for BBC World Service
Executive producer/producer: Friends and foes, a landmark ten-part series on the history of diplomacy for BBC Radio 4
Producer: Destroyer of  worlds Radio 4 archive about the British contribution to the atom bomb
Producer: Special Relationship: Uncovered about the Anglo American political relationship
Producer: Churchill's record box
Presenter: This train rides again about the March on Washington
Presenter: Night of the Long Knives, a Radio 4 archive hour about Harold Macmillan
Presenter/producer: No country for old women about Ghana witchcamps for BBC World Service

Awards
  Medical Journalists' Association Silver Award for Does He Take Sugar
 2002 One World Award for radio documentary
 2002 Sony Awards (shortlisted)
 2006 Education Journalist of the Year Award for Outstanding Education Reporting
 2017 Best Current Affairs Documentary/Feature Maker (nominated)

References

Living people
British women writers
BBC people
Alumni of Somerville College, Oxford
Year of birth missing (living people)